George Gross (January 26, 1941 – April 27, 2010) was an American football defensive tackle.  He played professionally in the American Football League (AFL) for five seasons, from 1963 to 1967, with the San Diego Chargers.  He joined the Chargers' outstanding defensive line, known as the "Fearsome Foursome", playing with defensive ends Bob Petrich and Earl Faison and defensive tackle Ernie Ladd. Gross was born in Vajola, Romania (Weilau in his native German; now Uila, Romania) and died in Fairhope, Alabama.

See also
 List of American Football League players

References

1941 births
2010 deaths
American football defensive tackles
Auburn Tigers football players
San Diego Chargers players
Sportspeople from Elizabeth, New Jersey
People from Mureș County
Players of American football from New Jersey
Romanian players of American football
Romanian emigrants to the United States
American people of German-Romanian descent
American Football League players